

Events 
Athanasius Kircher in his 1665 work Mundus subterraneus explained fossils as giant bones as those belonging to extinct races of giant humans.

References 

17th century in paleontology
Paleontology